Madaripur Sadar is an upazila of Madaripur District in the Division of Dhaka, Bangladesh.

Geography
It has 74451 households and total area 283.14 km2. It is bounded by Shibchar and Zanjira Upazilas on the north, Kalkini and Kotalipara Upazilas on the south, Shariatpur Sadar Upazila on the east, Rajoir Upazila on the west.

Demographics
As of the 2011 Bangladesh census, Madaripur Sadar has a Population Total 345,764; male 171,329, female 174,435; Muslim 336,754, Hindu 35,819, Buddhist 12, Christian 103 and others 97.  Males constitute49.6% of the population, and females 50.4%.  This Upazila's eighteen up population is 187868. Madaripur Sadar has an average literacy rate of 51.1% (7+ years), and the national average of 48.4% literate.

Points of interest 
 Shah Madar (RA) Dargah Sharif,
 Algi Kazibari Mosque - Bahadurpur,
 Jhaoudi Giri - Jhaoudi,
 Auliapur Neelkuthi - Chilarchar,
 Mithapur Zamindar Bari - Mithapur
 Mather Bazaar Math - Khoajpur,
 Parboter Bagan - Mastofapur,
 Madaripur Shakuni Lake,
 Charmuguria Bandar,
 Narayan Mandir - Panichatra,
 Kulpadi Zamindar Bari and Weather office.

Administration
Madaripur Sadar Upazila is divided into Madaripur Municipality and 15 union parishads: Bahadurpur, Chilar Char, Dhurail, Dudkhali, Ghatmajhi, Jhaoudi, Kalikapur, Kandua, Khoajpur, Kunia, Mastofapur, Panchkhola, Reyarpur, Rasti, and Sirkhara. The union parishads are subdivided into 159 mauzas and 185 villages.

Madaripur Municipality is subdivided into 9 wards and 34 mahallas.

Education
Currently there have no full-fledged public and/or private universities except few colleges affiliated with national university.

Literacy rate and educational institutions Average literacy 51.1%; male 53.9%, female 48.4%. Noted educational institutions:
 Government Nazimuddin College (1948)
 Charmuguria College (1978)
 Government Sufiya Mahila College (1984)
 Syed Abul Hossain College (1989)
 Donovan Government Girls' High School (1914)
 United Islamia Government High School (1950) [Before Madaripur High School (1885)]
 Madaripur Public Institution (1953)
 Mithapur LS High School (1915)
 Charmuguria Merchants High School (1931)
 Tantibari Islamia High School (1954)
 AC North Kalagachhia High School' (1961)
 Ghatokchar Multilateral High School (1963)
 Bahadurpur High School' (1968)
 Julio Kuri High School (1972)
 Charnachana Fazil Madrasa (1912)

Notable residents 
 Shah Madar
 Basudeb Dasgupta
 Ava Alam
 Ashim Saha
 Shajahan Khan
 AFM Bahauddin Nasim
 Mohammad Nizamuddin Ahmed
 Nargis Akhter

See also
 Upazilas of Bangladesh
 Madaripur District
 Dhaka Division

References

Upazilas of Madaripur District